Gallifrey  is a dark surface feature on Pluto's moon Charon. It is named after the fictional planet Gallifrey in the television series Doctor Who. As a further homage to Doctor Who, Gallifrey Macula is bisected by Tardis Chasma.

References

Surface features of Charon
Doctor Who